Lü Ji (1909 – January 5, 2002), originally named Lü Zhanqing (吕展青; pinyin: Lǚ Zhǎnqīng), was a Chinese composer. He was also a music writer, educator, and administrator.

He was born in Xiangtan, Hunan in 1909 and became interested in music from an early age, learning to play several traditional instruments. He graduated from Changsha Chang Jun Secondary School in Changsha, and studied music at the Shanghai Music Training School (now the Shanghai Conservatory of Music). In 1931 or 1932 he joined the Leftist Dramatic League in Shanghai, and he joined the Chinese Communist Party in 1935. He became one of the most active composers of revolutionary Chinese music during the 1930s.

In a 1936 article entitled "Zhongguo xin yinyue" (China New Music), he set out his philosophy about revolutionary music:

After the establishment of the People's Republic of China in 1949, he was appointed vice president of the Central Conservatory of Music in Beijing.

His best-known compositions include "Goddess of Freedom", "New September 18 Tune", 保衛馬德進而, “School Song of the Counter-Japanese Military and Political University", "Going to the Front-lines after Graduation", "Railroad Workers' Song", and the choral work "Nirvana of the Phoenix".

He published books in the field of music education and the guqin.

Lü died at Peking Union Medical College Hospital on January 5, 2002, at the age of 92.

References

See also
Nie Er
Ren Guang
Xian Xinghai
He Luting

1909 births
2002 deaths
People from Xiangtan
People's Republic of China composers
Musicians from Hunan
Educators from Hunan
20th-century musicologists